The 1985 Macau Grand Prix Formula Three was the 32nd Macau Grand Prix race to be held on the streets of Macau on 24 November 1985. It was the second edition for Formula Three cars. The race was won by Brazilian driver Mauricio Gugelmin, driving a Ralt RT30-Volkswagen.

Entry list

Classification

Race

References

External links
 The official website of the Macau Grand Prix

Macau Grand Prix
Grand
Macau